Trenbolone acetate, sold under brand names such as Finajet and Finaplix among others, is an androgen and anabolic steroid (AAS) medication which is used in veterinary medicine, specifically to increase the profitability of livestock by promoting muscle growth in cattle. It is given by injection into muscle.

Side effects of trenbolone acetate include symptoms of masculinization like acne, increased body hair growth, scalp hair loss, voice changes, and increased sexual desire. The drug is a synthetic androgen and anabolic steroid and hence is an agonist of the androgen receptor (AR), the biological target of androgens like testosterone and dihydrotestosterone (DHT). It has strong anabolic effects and highly androgenic effects, as well as potent progestogenic effects, and weak glucocorticoid effects. Trenbolone acetate is an androgen ester and a short-lasting prodrug of trenbolone in the body.

Trenbolone acetate was discovered in 1963 and was introduced for veterinary use in the early 1970s. In addition to its veterinary use, trenbolone acetate is used to improve physique and performance, and is purchased from black market suppliers. The drug is a controlled substance in many countries and so non-veterinary use is generally illicit.

Uses

Veterinary uses

In the livestock industry, trenbolone acetate is more often called Finaplix. It was intentionally developed to promote androgen and gain muscle mass in cattle. Due to its properties, this allows livestock to grow as much muscle as possible before they are transported to a slaughterhouse.

Methyl cellulose and yellow dye are usually present in pellets given to livestock. A single dosage generally consists of 10 pellets, and a package of Finaplix usually consists of one cartridge, which contains 100 pellets (See Figure). This is usually given to the animal by means of a subcutaneous injection into the posterior location of the ear (See Figure) with the use of an implanter gun. Finaplix is consistently implanted until the animal is ready to be slaughtered. There is no withholding period. Due to the common practice of trenbolone acetate use in veterinary medicine, it is quite common to find traces of trenbolone metabolites in cattle worldwide.

Non-medical uses

Bodybuilding
Trenbolone acetate was never approved for use in humans and therefore guidelines for human consumption do not exist. However, athletes and bodybuilders have been using trenbolone acetate as a physique- and performance-enhancing drug for decades. There are a large number of benefits as a bodybuilder through using trenbolone acetate as an AAS. Unlike testosterone, trenbolone acetate does not cause any fluid retention while gaining muscle mass. This allows bodybuilders to appear leaner, and this is why it is more commonly used whilst preparing for competitive events. Trenbolone acetate does not convert into an estrogenic metabolite, and this results in a lack of estrogenic side effects. Trenbolone enanthate is also a very commonly used AAS and lasts much longer than trenbolone acetate with intramuscular injection.

Medical uses
Trenbolone acetate was never approved for use in humans and hence has no medical uses. However, as an AAS, it would be expected to be effective for indications in which other AAS are useful such as the treatment of conditions like androgen deficiency, wasting syndromes and muscle atrophy, and certain types of anemia.

Trenbolone was produced for human use as a human grade product, but only once. The product came in 1.5ml ampoules consisting of 76.2 mg of Trenbolone hexahydrobenzylcarbonate and made  by Negma Pharmaceuticals of France.

Side effects
Trenbolone acetate, like any other AAS, has many side effects. The strong androgenic nature of trenbolone acetate facilitates its tendency to produce virilization and this is why it is not recommended for women for physique- or performance-enhancing purposes. The side effects of trenbolone acetate are similar to other AAS; however, the negative side effects that are specifically facilitated by trenbolone acetate are as follows.

Androgenic
Trenbolone acetate has androgenic activity. Specific to the androgenic properties of trenbolone, common side effects of the AAS use include oily skin, acne, seborrhea, increased facial/body hair growth, and accelerated scalp hair loss. These side effects strongly rely on an individual's genetics and may not always occur in every individual. Men susceptible to hair loss related illnesses, such as baldness have a higher chance of becoming permanently bald with the use of trenbolone acetate. In women, voice deepening, hirsutism, clitoral enlargement, and virilization in general may occur.

Hypogonadism
Trenbolone acetate contributes greatly to muscle mass and feed efficiency; however, administration of the AAS suppresses natural testosterone production; i.e., it has the potential to cause  hypogonadism. This is a common effect of all AAS; the only difference is the variation in how much they suppress in comparison to others.

Cardiovascular
Administration of any AAS can lead to cardiovascular issues. Trenbolone acetate can have a negative and strong impact on cholesterol through suppressing both high-density lipoprotein (HDL) cholesterol and increasing low-density lipoprotein (LDL) cholesterol. When compared to oral AAS, trenbolone acetate has a stronger negative effect on cholesterol levels. This negative effect is much more severe with the use of injectable AAS, particularly trenbolone acetate.

"Tren cough"
The exact mechanisms underlying the cause of the tren cough are not known; however, trenbolone acetate's androgenic effect activates a variety of lipid-like active compounds which are called prostaglandins. Many of these prostaglandins are inflammatory and vasoconstrictive. Prostaglandins are signalled through two varying pathways cyclooxygenase (COX) (Also known as: prostaglandin-endoperoxide synthase) and lipoxygenases (LOX) (also known as: EC 1.13.11.34, EC 1.13.11.33, etc.). The bradykinin peptide is well known to promote a cough reaction associated with ACE inhibitor medications prescribed for hypertension.

Estrogenic and progestogenic
No form of trenbolone, including trenbolone acetate, is estrogenic. Excess fluid retention is not possible with the administration of this AAS as a result of its not being estrogenic as opposed to testosterone. However, due to trenbolone's potent progestogenic activity, gynecomastia, which is characterized by development and swelling of breast tissue, may still be possible. Stimulation of estrogenic mechanisms are enforced by progestogenic activity as trenbolone acetate and its compounds bind with high affinity to the progesterone receptor. It has been assumed that gynecomastia as a result of trenbolone use is due to a buildup of the hormone prolactin; however, a variety of studies conclude that it is the progestogenic activity of trenbolone promoting this and not prolactin. Trenbolone also has a negative impact on blood pressure, but it does not appear to negatively affect most healthy adult men in this way.

Pharmacology

Pharmacodynamics

Trenbolone acetate is a prodrug of trenbolone. Like other AAS, trenbolone is an agonist of the androgen receptor (AR) and hence has anabolic and androgenic activity as well as antigonadotropic activity. Trenbolone carries a rating for both anabolic potency and androgenic potency of 500, relative to a standard of nandrolone acetate (rating 100 for both). In addition to its anabolic and androgenic activity, trenbolone is an agonist of the progesterone receptor (PR), and in relation to this, has moderate to strong progestogenic activity. Conversely, trenbolone acetate is not a substrate for aromatase and hence lacks estrogenic activity. The compound also has weak glucocorticoid activity.

Similar to many other AAS, trenbolone acetate has the capability to produce insulin-like growth factor-1 (IGF-1). This naturally produced protein-based hormone affects every cell in the body of an organism and plays a large role in muscle recovery and rejuvenation. Extreme muscle growth and cell splitting compared is facilitated through trenbolone acetate administration when compared to other AAS. The facilitation of IGF-1 plays a significant role in the functions and properties of the central nervous system, pulmonary system, muscle tissue, ligaments, cartilage, and tendons.

Trenbolone acetate also has the ability to increase red blood cell count. With a larger amount of red blood cells, blood oxygenation is enhanced. This allows for enhanced muscular endurance and therefore promotes a faster rate of recovery. Trenbolone acetate is capable of inhibiting glucocorticoids such as cortisol. The properties of glucocorticoid are the opposite of androgens as muscle tissue depletion and fat gain is promoted. Administration of trenbolone acetate aims at decreasing the production of glucocorticoid hormones. Trenbolone acetate’s contribution to feed efficiency, also known as nutrient efficiency is what makes it an attractive AAS used for agricultural purposes. Food is one of the most anabolic substances that any living organism can consume, and therefore with the administration of trenbolone acetate, every nutrient in the body becomes a lot more valuable. This facilitates an organism's body that is exposed to the AAS to make better use of the nutrients already consumed.

Pharmacokinetics
The acetate ester of trenbolone acetate allows for slow release post injection. This ester gives trenbolone an activated elimination half-life of about 3 days.

Chemistry

Trenbolone acetate, or trenbolone 17β-acetate, is a synthetic estrane steroid and a derivative of nandrolone (19-nortestosterone). It is the C17β acetate ester of trenbolone, which itself is δ9,11-19-nortestosterone (δ9,11-19-NT) or estra-4,9,11-trien-17β-ol-3-one. Other trenbolone esters include trenbolone enanthate, trenbolone hexahydrobenzylcarbonate, and trenbolone undecanoate.

Structure–activity relationships
Trenbolone acetate is a modified form of nandrolone. The structure of trenbolone acetate is a 19-nor classification, which represents a structural change of the testosterone hormone. Trenbolone acetate lacks a carbon atom at the 19 position and carries a double bond at carbons 9 and 11. The position of these carbons slows its metabolism, which greatly increases its binding affinity to the AR, and inhibits it from undergoing aromatization into the corresponding estrogenic metabolite. Trenbolone acetate contains trenbolone modified with the addition of a carboxylic acid ester (acetic acid) at the 17β-hydroxyl group. This facilitates the slow release of the AAS from the area of injection.

History
Trenbolone acetate was first synthesized in 1963 and approved by the livestock industry as a growth promoter for beef cattle in the early 1970s. During this period of its first administration, trenbolone acetate was sold under the names Finajet and Finaject. The original manufacturer of trenbolone acetate discontinued during the late 1980s and administered the synthesis of subcutaneous pellets called Finaplix. These pellets aimed to increase muscle mass and lean tissue of cattle prior to slaughter to increase the profitability of livestock when measured in total pounds of meat sold.

The drug appears to have been an early development project of Roussel Uclaf, a French pharmaceutical company, and by the early 1970s, it was being sold as an injectable. There are a number of trenbolone esters but trenbolone acetate is the only one known to be produced in veterinary AAS manufacturers.

Trenbolone acetate became popular among bodybuilders and athletes during the early 1980s. During this period, the AAS was transported illegally from Europe in large quantities. Although trenbolone acetate was very popular for a short amount of time, the large amounts of supplies were discontinued in 1987. This decision was based upon the public concern of sports doping and its negative effects on athletes.

Society and culture

Generic names

Brand names
Trenbolone acetate is or has been sold alone for veterinary use under the brand names Component TH, Component TS, Finaject, Finajet, Finaplix-H, and Finaplix-S. It is or has also been sold in combination with estradiol or estradiol benzoate for veterinary use under the brand names Revalor and Synovex.

Distribution and regulation
Trenbolone acetate, specifically referred to as Finaplix in the livestock industry, is available to purchase in veterinary drug markets. A typical cartridge usually comes in the form of 20 mg pellets. It generally comes in the form of implant pellets containing 20 mg of trenbolone acetate each. Preparations containing trenbolone acetate remain rare since its decline in production after the 1980s. Using AAS for any other purpose, or without a doctor's prescription, is illegal in most countries. Major sporting and bodybuilding organizations ban the use of controlled AAS, and the possession or sale of drugs can lead to arrest and conviction of drug-trafficking in many countries, including the United States and Australia. However, in the United Kingdom, owning AAS for personal use as a bodybuilding supplement is not illegal, but selling the AAS without a valid medical license or reason is still against the law.

Doping in sports

Regardless of their legality, AAS are still banned by most sporting leagues in the country, who routinely conduct drug tests to find the users of any AAS. There are known cases of doping in sports with trenbolone acetate by professional athletes.

References

Further reading

External links 

Acetate esters
Androgen esters
Androgens and anabolic steroids
Estranes
Glucocorticoids
Ketones
Prodrugs
Progestogens
Veterinary drugs
World Anti-Doping Agency prohibited substances